In mathematics, a Butler group is a group that is the image of a completely decomposable abelian group of finite rank.

References

 

Abelian group theory